Murray Campbell is a Canadian computer scientist known for being part of the team that created Deep Blue; the first computer to defeat a world chess champion.

Biography 
Campbell was involved in surveillance projects related to petroleum production, disease outbreak, and financial data. In earlier work, Campbell was a member of the teams that developed chess machines: HiTech and a project to culminate in Deep Blue, the latter being the first computer to defeat the reigning world chess champion, Garry Kasparov, in a challenge match, in 1997. Kasparov had won an earlier match the previous year. (Based on text taken from a newsletter by Mike Oettel, of the Shriver Center at UMBC.)

Campbell visited UMBC for a speech called "IBM's Deep Blue: Ten Years After" on February 5, 2007. In the University Center building, he presented the background that led up to the decisive match with Kasparov, reviewed the match itself (with Kasparov and similar matches), and explored some of the design decisions that were made when building Deep Blue.  Murray put emphasis on some of the broader implications of Deep Blue's development and victory on the information technology industry and artificial intelligence.

He is a Senior Manager in the Business Analytics and Mathematical Sciences Department at the IBM Thomas J. Watson Research Center in Yorktown Heights, New York, USA. The mission of the Services Modeling group is to apply technical expertise in areas such as optimization, forecasting, probabilistic analysis. The focus is in the area of Business Analytics and Workforce Management. Solutions are developed that include services project management, skill analytics, demand forecasting, workplace learning, workforce optimization, and strategic planning.

Personal life 
Campbell himself played chess at near National Master strength in Canada during his student days, but has not played competitively for more than 20 years.  His peak Elo rating was around 2200.

Honors and awards
North American Computer Chess Championship:  Member of winning teams in 1985 (HiTech), 1987 (ChipTest), 1988 (Deep Thought), 1989 (HiTech and Deep Thought), 1990 (Deep Thought), 1991 (Deep Thought) and 1994 (Deep Thought).

1989 World Computer Chess Championship, winning team (Deep Thought)

Campbell shared the $100,000 Fredkin Prize with Feng-hsiung Hsu and A. Joseph Hoane Jr. in 1997.  The prize was awarded for developing the first computer (Deep Blue) to defeat a reigning world chess champion in a match.
 
Campbell received the Allen Newell Research Excellence Medal in 1997, citing his contributions to Deep Blue (first computer to defeat a world chess champion), Deep Thought (first Grandmaster level computer) and HiTech (first Senior Master level computer).

Campbell was elected Fellow of the Association for the Advancement of Artificial Intelligence in 2012 for "significant contributions to computer game-playing, especially chess, and the associated improvement in public awareness of the AI endeavor."

References

External links
Home page at IBM Research

IBM employees
Canadian computer scientists
American computer scientists
Canadian chess players
Computer chess people
University of Alberta alumni
Carnegie Mellon University alumni
Living people
Year of birth missing (living people)
Fellows of the Association for the Advancement of Artificial Intelligence